The ruins of the Château de la Tourette are in the commune of Vernoux-en-Vivarais in the Ardèche département of France. It dates from the 14th century.

Protection 
The remains of the castle, and notably its square keep, were listed as a monuments historique in 1996, at the same time as a fortified house on the same property constructed in the 15th and 16th centuries.

See also 
 List of castles in France

References 

Ruined castles in Auvergne-Rhône-Alpes
Monuments historiques of Auvergne-Rhône-Alpes